The Tavastia Club is a popular rock music club in Helsinki, Finland. The house is owned by Hämäläis-Osakunta, one of the student nations at the University of Helsinki, but since 1991 the club has been operated by a private enterprise renting the house from the nation. It is located in central Helsinki Kamppi district on the street Urho Kekkosen katu. The capacity is 700 people.

History 
The house was built for the Tavastian nation as Hämäläisten talo ("Tavastians' house") in 1931. From early on, it was actively rented for entertainment purposes, including theater plays and dances. By the 1950s it had become a popular dance place and carried the slang name Hämis. During the 1960s the house started to concentrate more on rock music.

In 1970 the club was given the name Tavastia klubi. The programme included weekly jazz, rock and disco concerts. During the 1970s many bands, which would later become very famous in Finland and even abroad, rose to fame from the concerts in Tavastia. These include such acts as Hurriganes, Sleepy Sleepers, Wigwam and Dave Lindholm. During this time a few popular foreign acts played in the club as well, including Tom Waits, John Lee Hooker and Dr. Feelgood.

By the 1980s the club had achieved a legendary status in the Finnish rock music scene. In the 1980s more domestic bands rose to fame through Tavastia, most importantly Hanoi Rocks. Foreign visitors included Nico featuring Mad Sheer Khan, Sir Douglas Quintet, Fabulous Thunderbirds, Jason & The Scorchers, Dead Kennedys, The Ventures, Public Image Ltd, Pogues and Nick Cave.

The 1990s saw new popular domestic acts rise to fame from the stages of the club. These include Don Huonot, Kingston Wall and The 69 Eyes. In 1994 a "little brother" club Semifinal was opened in the basement of Tavastia to cater for the "rising star" bands and other smaller acts. For example, HIM played for the first time in the Tavastia's address in Semifinal when Ville Valo, the lead-singer to be, was still playing bass. Valo is said to have told the Tavastia's manager Juhani Merimaa that he would one day play a sold-out gig in the upstairs club. Valo kept his promise, and HIM went on to become one of the best selling acts in the history of Finnish music.

Today, Tavastia is one of the oldest European rock music clubs that remain in continuous use.

Artists who have performed at Tavastia Club 

 The 69 Eyes
 50 Cent
 AC/DC
 Alice In Chains
 Amoral
 Anthrax
 Antic Cafe
 Backyard Babies
 Beast in Black
 Black Crowes
 Black Sabbath
 Billy Talent
 The Breeders
 Celtic Frost
 Children Of Bodom
 The Cramps
 The Cross
 D.A.D.
 Dead Kennedys
 Europe
 Fabulous Thunderbirds
 Dir en grey
 Dr. Alban
 Foo Fighters
 The Gazette
 Girlschool
 Hanoi Rocks
 Hawkwind
 The Hellacopters
 HIM
 The Hives
 The Hooters
 Hurriganes
 Kalmah
 Kamelot
 Kreator
 Lemonheads
 Lordi
 Manfred Mann's Earth Band
 Nazareth
 New York Dolls
 Nick Cave and the Bad Seeds
 Nightwish
 Offspring
 The Pogues
 Public Image Limited
 Ramones
 Reckless Love
 Santa Cruz
 Screaming Trees
 Brian Setzer
 Siouxsie and the Banshees
 Sonata Arctica
 Sonic Youth
 The Stone Roses
 Stratovarius
 Stryper
 Suede
 The Wailers
 Tom Waits
 W.A.S.P.

See also
Finnish rock
Kaivohuone

References

Further reading
Koistiainen Pasi: Ja rokki soi (Jalava, 2000) (in Finnish)
Lamppu Laamanen: Tavastia Klubi, Helsinki (Like, 2000) (in Finnish)

External links

 Official home page 

Buildings and structures in Helsinki
Culture in Helsinki
Tourist attractions in Helsinki
Nightclubs in Finland
Kamppi